Punkt Ø AS is a Norwegian art institution founded in 2006 with Østfold county as its largest shareholder. The institutions goal is to promote knowledge and understanding for Norwegian and international contemporary art. Punkt Ø runs Galleri F 15 and Momentum, a Nordic biennial for contemporary art.

References

External links
 Punkt Øs web site

Art museums and galleries in Norway